Bob Gormly (born 7 February 1947) is a former Australian rules footballer who played with Melbourne in the Victorian Football League (VFL).

Notes

External links 

1947 births
Living people
Australian rules footballers from Tasmania
Melbourne Football Club players